Berta Pujadas Boix (born 9 April 2000) is a Spanish professional footballer who plays as a centre back for Liga F club Valencia CF and the Spain women's national team.

Club career
Pujadas started her career at Barcelona B.

References

External links
Profile at La Liga

2000 births
Living people
Women's association football defenders
Spanish women's footballers
Footballers from Barcelona
Sportswomen from Catalonia
FC Barcelona Femení B players
RCD Espanyol Femenino players
Valencia CF Femenino players
Primera División (women) players
Spain women's youth international footballers